El Villar can refer to:

 Villar del Arzobispo, municipality in Valencia, Spain
 El Villar de Arnedo, municipality in La Rioja, Spain
 Elvillar/Bilar, municipality in Álava, Basque Country, Spain